Joshua Rashard Hawkins (born January 23, 1993) is an American football cornerback for the Arlington Renegades of the XFL. He played college football at East Carolina. Hawkins was signed by the Green Bay Packers as an undrafted free agent in 2016.

Professional career

Green Bay Packers
After going undrafted in the 2016 NFL Draft, Hawkins signed with the Green Bay Packers on May 6, 2016. He recorded five tackles and two interceptions in the preseason, earning him a spot on the Packers' 53-man roster.

On September 1, 2018, Hawkins was waived by the Packers.

Carolina Panthers
On September 4, 2018, Hawkins was signed to the Carolina Panthers' practice squad. He was promoted to the active roster on September 22, 2018. He was waived on November 14, 2018.

Kansas City Chiefs
On November 18, 2018, Hawkins was signed to the Kansas City Chiefs practice squad. He was released on December 6, 2018.

Philadelphia Eagles
On December 11, 2018, Hawkins was signed to the Philadelphia Eagles practice squad. He was promoted to the active roster on December 24, 2018.

Hawkins was waived during final roster cuts on August 30, 2019.

Dallas Renegades
Hawkins was selected in the 2020 XFL Draft by the Dallas Renegades. He had his contract terminated when the league suspended operations on April 10, 2020.

Atlanta Falcons
On April 15, 2020, Hawkins signed with the Atlanta Falcons. He was waived on September 5, 2020, and signed to the practice squad the next day. He was released from the practice squad on September 15, 2020.

Carolina Panthers (second stint)
On October 20, 2020, Hawkins was signed to the Carolina Panthers practice squad. He was released on October 26.

Detroit Lions
On December 29, 2020, Hawkins signed with the practice squad of the Detroit Lions.

Arlington Renegades 
On November 17, 2022, Hawkins was drafted by the Arlington Renegades of the XFL, returning to his former team in 2020. He was placed on the reserve list by the team on March 6, 2023.

NFL career statistics

References

External links
Green Bay Packers bio

1993 births
Living people
American football cornerbacks
Arlington Renegades players
Atlanta Falcons players
Carolina Panthers players
Dallas Renegades players
Detroit Lions players
East Carolina Pirates football players
Green Bay Packers players
Kansas City Chiefs players
Philadelphia Eagles players
Players of American football from Winston-Salem, North Carolina